Cornforth is a village in County Durham, England. It is situated a short distance to the north-east of Ferryhill.

Before the middle part of the Victorian era, when coal mining was at its height in County Durham, Cornforth was in the parish of Bishop Middleham.

Thomas Hutchinson (bap. 1698, d. 1769) was a classical scholar, born in Cornforth and baptised there on 17 May 1698.

References

External links 

 West Cornforth Village Website
 Cornforth Colliery entry on Durham Mining Museum
 Cornforth Quarry entry on Durham Mining Museum

Villages in County Durham